Santa Marina is a town and comune in the province of Salerno in the Campania region of south-western Italy.

Geography
The municipality, located in southern Cilento, borders with Ispani, Morigerati, San Giovanni a Piro, Torre Orsaia, Tortorella and Vibonati.

Santa Marina counts 3 hamlets (frazioni): Lupinata, Policastro Bussentino and Poria. Policastro is the most populated municipal settlement and a sea resort.

See also
Cilento
Cilentan Coast

References

External links

Official website 

Cities and towns in Campania
Localities of Cilento